Demidov Square (Russian - Демидовская площадь) is a square in the Tsentralny City District of Barnaul in Russia, named after the Demidov dynasty. It is the site of the Demidovsky Pillar.

Barnaul
Squares in Russia

Buildings and structures in Altai Krai
Cultural heritage monuments in Altai Krai
Objects of cultural heritage of Russia of federal significance